Ivan Oleksiyovych Svitlichny (Svetlichny; ; 1929–1992) was a Ukrainian poet, literary critic, and Soviet dissident.

Biography 

Ivan Svitlichny was born on 20 September 1929 in Polovykino, Luhansk Oblast to a family of farmers.

In 1952 he graduated from the philological faculty at Kharkov University. In 1954 he gained his PhD at Shevchenko Institute of Literature in Kyiv. From 1954 to 1965 he worked as an editor at the literary magazine Dnepr.

Svitlichny became close to Vasyl Symonenko and helped circulate his poems in samizdat (typescript literature) and magnitizdat (unofficial audio tape recordings). Svitlichny's poetry in turn was translated into Russian by dissident Yuli Daniel.

In the early 1960s, Svitlichny was one of the founders of the Club of Creative Youth in Kyiv. The club of Ukrainian left-wing intellectuals was closely watched by the Ukrainian KGB. In August 1965 he was arrested for his involvement in the club and was imprisoned for one year in labour camp.

In January 1971 Svitlichny along with 18 others was arrested in connection with the case of Yaroslav Dobosh. Dobosh was a 24-year-old Belgian of Ukrainian roots who had been recruited by a Ukrainian nationalist organisation to distribute anti-Communist literature in Ukraine. Svitlichny was among Dobosh's main contacts. He was sentenced to seven years of forced labour and five years of exile. He served his time Perm-35 labour camp.

In 1977, Andrei Sakharov included Svitlichny's name in an appeal to Jimmy Carter.

Svitlichny was released in January 1983. He returned in a gravely ill condition, having suffered a stroke in prison camp. For the last three years of his life he could not move or speak.

Ivan Svitlychny died on 25 October 1992. He is buried in Kyiv at the Baikove Cemetery.

Svitlychny was made a member of the International PEN Club in 1978 and was a member of the Union of Writers of Ukraine in 1990. In 1989 Svitlychny was awarded the Vasyl Stus Prize. In 1994 he was posthumously awarded the Shevchenko National Prize.

Svitlichny was the brother of dissident and human rights activist Nadiya Svitlychna.

References 

1929 births
1992 deaths
Writers from Kyiv
National University of Kharkiv alumni
Soviet dissidents
Ukrainian poets
Ukrainian dissidents
Recipients of the Shevchenko National Prize
20th-century poets
Ukrainian nationalists
Ukrainian victims of human rights abuses
Ukrainian anti-Soviet resistance movement